Abacetus vertagus is a species of ground beetle in the subfamily Pterostichinae. It was described by Peringuey in 1904.

References

vertagus
Beetles described in 1904